Ben Kaplan may refer to:

 Ben Kaplan (author) (born 1977), economist and public commentator
 Benjamin Kaplan (1911–2010), American copyright scholar and jurist
 Benjamin J. Kaplan, historian 
 Ben Kaplan, a character in the British spy series Spooks